The Tri-County Conference was a league that ran from 1950 to 1965, and is considered a direct forerunner to the Mid-Indiana Conference. The league began in 1950 as the Howard-Miami Conference, as the three schools left from the post-consolidation Howard County Conference joined with three schools from Miami County. The conference changed its name to the TCC when Swayzee and Sweetser, from Grant County joined. When school consolidation forced the conference to look outside its footprint to find similar-sized schools, in 1965 it became the current MIC.

This should not be confused with conferences of the same name based in the southern and western portions of the state.

Former members

 Eastern also played in the Mississinewa Valley Conference from 1953 until 1965.

References 

Indiana high school athletic conferences
High school sports conferences and leagues in the United States
Indiana High School Athletic Association disestablished conferences